Susanne Kreher (born 20 December 1998) is a German skeleton racer who has competed since 2015.

Career 
Susanne Kreher switched from athletics to skeleton in 2015 and competes for BSC Sachsen Oberbärenburg, where she is trained by David Friedrich, the state coach of Saxony. She made her debut in the European Skeleton Cup on November 10, 2016 in Innsbruck on the Olympia Eiskanal Igls, finishing sixth. Her first and so far only victory in the European Cup was on January 12, 2018 on her home track in Altenberg.

In 2018, she qualified the first time for the Skeleton Junior World Championships, which were held in 2018 at the St. Moritz. She secured the bronze medal behind Anna Fernstädt and Yulia Kanakina.
In the 2018/19 season, she started to compete in the Intercontinental Cup and made her debut on November 23, 2018 in Winterberg. She finished sixth in her first competition and she was able to win her third race in the Intercontinental Cup. She won the Park City competition on January 19, 2019 ahead of Anna Fernstädt and Kelly Curtis. She also managed to win the last race of the season on January 20, 2019 in Lake Placid.

Before the 2019/20 season, she secured the bronze medal at the German Skeleton Championships behind Tina Hermann and Jacqueline Lölling on November 9, 2019. In the 2019/20 season she started to compete in the Intercontinental Cup and won the first two competitions on the Olympic track in Sochi. In addition, she also won the race in Winterberg on December 7, 2019 and it was her fifth consecutive victory in the Intercontinental Cup. At the end of the season, she finished second in the 2019–20 Intercontinental Cup standings behind Kelly Curtis.

Susanne Kreher contested her debut in the World Cup on January 17, 2020, because Sophia Griebel was out due to illness. Her debut competition in Innsbruck,she took sixth place and got 176 world cup points. This race was her sole world cup race in this season and she completed 28th place in the overall World Cup. At the Skeleton Junior World Championships 2020, which were held in the Veltins Eisarena in Winterberg, she took second place behind Anna Fernstädt and ahead of Hannah Neise. She sustained an injury during the competition and thus missed the opportunity to qualify for the 2020 Bobsleigh and Skeleton World Championships in Altenberg.

In 2022, Kreher competed and won Gold at the Junior World Championships in Innsbruck, Austria.

World Cup results
All results are sourced from the International Bobsleigh and Skeleton Federation (IBSF).

References

External links

German female skeleton racers
1998 births
Living people
21st-century German women
People from Meschede